Monoamine oxidase B, also known as MAOB, is an enzyme that in humans is encoded by the MAOB gene.

The protein encoded by this gene belongs to the flavin monoamine oxidase family. It is an enzyme located in the outer mitochondrial membrane. It catalyzes the oxidative deamination of biogenic and xenobiotic amines and plays an important role in the catabolism of neuroactive and vasoactive amines in the central nervous system and peripheral tissues (such as dopamine). This protein preferentially degrades benzylamine and phenethylamine.  Similarly to monoamine oxidase A (MAOA), it also degrades dopamine [though some new research contradicts this, suggesting that MAOB does not directly degrade dopamine, but is responsible for GABA synthesis].

Structure
Monoamine oxidase B has a hydrophobic bipartite elongated cavity that (for the "open" conformation) occupies a combined volume close to 700 Å3. hMAO-A has a single cavity that exhibits a rounder shape and is larger in volume than the "substrate cavity" of hMAO-B.

The first cavity of hMAO-B has been termed the entrance cavity (290 Å3), the second substrate cavity or active site cavity (~390 Å3) – between both an isoleucine199 side-chain serves as a gate. Depending on the substrate or bound inhibitor, it can exist in either an open or a closed form, which has been shown to be important in defining the inhibitor specificity of hMAO B. At the end of the substrate cavity is the FAD coenzyme with sites for favorable amine binding about the flavin involving two nearly parallel tyrosyl (398 and 435) residues that form what has been termed an aromatic cage.

Differences between MAOA and MAOB
MAO-A is involved in the metabolism of tyramine; inhibition, in particular irreversible inhibition of MAO-A can result in a dangerous pressor effect when foods high in tyramine are consumed such as cheeses (informally known as the "cheese effect"). MAO-A is involved in the metabolism of serotonin, noradrenaline and dopamine whereas MAO-B metabolises the dopamine neurotransmitter. MAO-B is an enzyme on the outer mitochondrial membrane and catalyzes the oxidation of arylalkylamine neurotransmitters

Monoamine oxidase A (MAOA) generally metabolizes tyramine, norepinephrine (NE), serotonin (5-HT), and dopamine (DA) (and other less clinically relevant chemicals). In contrast, monoamine oxidase B (MAOB) mainly metabolizes dopamine (DA) (and other less clinically relevant chemicals). The differences between the substrate selectivity of the two enzymes are utilized clinically when treating specific disorders: Monoamine oxidase A inhibitors have been typically used in the treatment of depression, and monoamine oxidase B inhibitors are typically used in the treatment of Parkinson's disease. Nonspecific (i.e. MAOA/B combined) inhibitors can pose problems when taken concomitantly with tyramine-containing foods such as cheese, because the drug's inhibition of MAOA causes a dangerous elevation of serum tyramine levels, which can lead to hypertensive symptoms. Selective MAOB inhibitors bypass this problem by preferentially inhibiting MAOB, which mostly metabolizes DA. If MAOB is inhibited, then more DA is available for proper neuronal function, especially in Parkinson's Disease.

Roles in disease and aging
Alzheimer's disease (AD) and Parkinson's disease (PD) are both associated with elevated levels of MAO-B in the brain. The normal activity of MAO-B creates reactive oxygen species, which directly damage cells. MAO-B levels have been found to increase with age, suggesting a role in natural age related cognitive decline and the increased likelihood of developing neurological diseases later in life. More active polymorphisms of the MAO-B gene have been linked to negative emotionality, and suspected as an underlying factor in depression. Activity of MAO-B has also been shown to play a role in stress-induced cardiac damage. Over-expression and increased levels of MAO-B in the brain have also been linked to the accumulation of amyloid β-peptides (Aβ), through mechanisms of the amyloid precursor protein secretase, γ-secretase, responsible for the development of plaques, observed in Alzheimer's and Parkinson's patients. Evidence suggests that siRNA silencing of MAO-B, or inhibition of MAO-B through MAOI-B (Selegline, Rasagiline), slows the progression, improves and reverses the symptoms, associated with AD and PD, including the reduction of Aβ plaques in the brain.

Animal models
Transgenic mice that are unable to produce MAO-B are shown to be resistant to a mouse model of Parkinson's disease.  They also demonstrate increased responsiveness to stress (as with MAO-A knockout mice)  and increased β-PEA.  In addition, they exhibit behavioral disinhibition and reduced anxiety-like behaviors.

Inhibition of MAO-B in rats has been shown to prevent many age-related biological changes such as optic nerve degeneration, and extend average lifespan by up to 39%.

Effects of deficiency in humans
While people lacking the gene for MAO-A display intellectual disabilities and behavioral abnormalities, people lacking the gene for MAO-B display no abnormalities except elevated phenethylamine levels in urine, raising the question of whether MAO-B is actually a necessary enzyme. Newer research indicates the importance of phenethylamine and other trace amines, which are now known to regulate catecholamine and serotonin neurotransmission through the same receptor as amphetamine, TAAR1.

The prophylactic use of MAO-B inhibitors to slow natural human aging in otherwise healthy individuals has been proposed, but remains a highly controversial topic.

Selective inhibitors

Species-dependent divergences may hamper the extrapolation of inhibitor potencies.

Reversible

Natural

 Geiparvarin
 Desmethoxyyangonin, a constituent of kava extract; modest affinity
 Catechin and epicatechin. 
 Garlic
 Rosiridin (in vitro)

Synthetic 
 Safinamide and analogs
 5H-Indeno[1,2-c]pyridazin-5-ones (see 3d model)
 Substituted chalcones
 2-(N-Methyl-N-benzylaminomethyl)-1H-pyrrole
 1-(4-Arylthiazol-2-yl)-2-(3-methylcyclohexylidene)hydrazine
 2-Thiazolylhydrazone
 3,5-Diaryl pyrazole
 Pyrazoline derivatives
 Several coumarin derivatives and #C19* (see 3d model)
 Phenylcoumarins, extremely subtype selective and further analogs (see 3d model)
 Chromone-3-phenylcarboxamides
 Isatins
 Phthalimides
 8-Benzyloxycaffeines and CSC analogs
 (E,E)-8-(4-phenylbutadien-1-yl)caffeines, with A2A antagonistic component
 Indazole- and Indole-5-carboxamides

Irreversible (covalent) 
 Selegiline (Eldepryl, Zelapar, Emsam)
 Rasagiline (Azilect)

See also 
 Monoamine oxidase A

References